Berlín is a municipality in the Usulután department of El Salvador.

Etymology
The city's name was suggested by Don Serafín Brennen, a German, who also founded the city.

History
The area of what is now Berlín was settled by the Lenca and Pipil peoples.

Overview

The municipality of Berlín is made up of an urban center (pop. approx. 12,000) and 17 cantons or villages (pop. approx. 30,000). The urban center is located at 1,020 meters above sea level in the mountains of eastern El Salvador, with the territory extending to lowland cantons (zona baja) on the Lempa River and to highland cantons (zona alta) at as much as 1,500 meters above sea level. Some of the rural cantons include: Talpetates, Loma Alta, Las Delicias, El Colon, El Tablon.

Berlin is known for coffee farming, which historically was the main economic activity for the municipality and concentrated in the zona alta. In the zona baja, including the Mechotique region, activities include cattle and sugar cane farming, as well as farming of subsistence crops such as beans and corn. Nearby municipalities include Mercedes Umaña and Santiago de Maria; the largest nearby city is San Miguel.

Berlín's patron saint is San José, and the annual patron saint festival is celebrated from March 15–20. The city boasts two high schools, a coffee processing plant, a bank, a credit union, a thriving municipal market, a youth community center, numerous small businesses, a Catholic church, and several Evangelical congregations.

During the Salvadoran Civil War, Berlín was the site of several battles between the FMLN and military forces. The FMLN took control of the city for five days in 1983, but were driven out by heavy bombing by the military. The engagement resulted in significant destruction of property and civilian deaths.

Berlín was heavily damaged by flooding and landslides resulting from Hurricane Mitch in 1998 and by the earthquakes of January and February, 2001. To mitigate potential future natural disasters, an Environmental Unit (Unidad Ambiental) has been established within the mayor's office.

A severe thunderstorm with heavy rain caused flooding and landslides in May 2007 which resulted in the deaths of 5 people.  Efforts are currently underway to relocate the Brisas del Sol community, where the victims were from, away from the high risk area.

External links
 
 The Official Page of Berlín, El Salvador
 Wikipedia in Spanish

Municipalities of the Usulután Department